Luis Aurelio López Fernández (born 13 September 1993), also known as Buba López, is a Honduran professional footballer who plays as a goalkeeper for Real España, whom he captains, and the Honduras national team.

Club career

Real España
López started his career with Liga Nacional team Real C.D. España in 2013. He won the 2013 Apertura title and was integral for his side in the final against 
Real Sociedad.

LAFC and Orange County SC loan
On 24 January 2018, Major League Soccer side Los Angeles FC announced the signing of López on loan from Real España. The following 31 January, it was announced that López was rehabbing from a stress fracture in his right tibia. After being out six months, he was loaned to Los Angeles FC's affiliate Orange County SC on 13 July. The next day, he started his first match in a 3–0 home win against San Antonio FC in the USL Championship. He was later recalled and started his first league game in the MLS in a 2–0 home loss against Sporting Kansas City.

He returned to Real España after Los Angeles FC opted not to exercise his buy option.

International career

Honduras U-23
López was included in the Honduras squad for the football competition at the 2016 Summer Olympics in Rio de Janeiro. The year prior, Honduras had lost the final of the 2015 CONCACAF Men's Olympic Qualifying Championship to Mexico, but qualification was sealed for both nations and Honduras qualified for their third straight Olympics. López was the first-choice keeper throughout the tournament but kept only one clean sheet. He helped Honduras to the knockout stage, where they were eliminated by Brazil in the semi-finals. López started in the bronze-medal match, in which Honduras were defeated by Nigeria.

Honduras
López was an unused third goalkeeper for Honduras' 2014 World Cup campaign.
His first major role for the national team was when he was selected as the starting keeper for Honduras in the 2017 CONCACAF Gold Cup. López struggled with an injury throughout the tournament and ultimately Honduras were eliminated in the quarter-finals by Mexico.

Honours

Real C.D. España
Liga Nacional: 2013 Apertura, 2017 Apertura

Honduras
CONCACAF Nations League third place: 2021

Individual
CONCACAF Nations League Golden Glove: 2019–20
 CONCACAF Nations League Finals Best XI: 2021

References

External links
 
 MLS profile

1993 births
Living people
People from San Pedro Sula
Association football goalkeepers
Honduran footballers
Honduran expatriate footballers
Honduran expatriate sportspeople in the United States
Liga Nacional de Fútbol Profesional de Honduras players
Major League Soccer players
USL Championship players
Real C.D. España players
Los Angeles FC players
Orange County SC players
Honduras international footballers
2014 FIFA World Cup players
2014 Copa Centroamericana players
2015 CONCACAF Gold Cup players
2017 Copa Centroamericana players
2017 CONCACAF Gold Cup players
2019 CONCACAF Gold Cup players
2021 CONCACAF Gold Cup players
Olympic footballers of Honduras
Footballers at the 2016 Summer Olympics
Copa Centroamericana-winning players
Central American Games gold medalists for Honduras
Central American Games medalists in football